Gazovik Stadium is a multi-purpose stadium in Orenburg, Russia.  It is currently used mostly for football matches and is the home stadium of FC Orenburg.  The stadium holds 10,046 people, all seated.

References

External links
Stadium Information

Football venues in Russia
Sport in Orenburg